Ctenobrycon spilurus, the silver tetra, is a species of tropical freshwater fish sometime referred to as the silver dollar tetra. It is a member of the family Characidae in the order Characiformes. The fish is native to Orinoco River basin and coastal river basins of Guyana, Suriname and French Guiana, and can be found in shallow slow moving streams with heavy vegetation.

Description 

Silver tetras have a silvery-gray color and a round flattened body. But there is a slight olive green cast to some of these fish. There is some black at the base of their caudal fin. Some have a small dark spot near their gill covers. The only relieving bit of color is a glow of red in the rear portion of the anal fin (only in males). The dorsal fin is fairly short. It has a small mouth with enlarged lips.

In the aquarium 

Commercially breed silver tetra are good for beginners. They are very active in daylight hours. The fish prefers a heavily planted aquarium with dim light. But an aquarium with plastic plants with driftwood will do too. As long as the fish have a place to hide. It is necessary to keep them in a school of 6–8 other silver tetras in a 30-gallon tank. With a pH range of 6.0–7.5. The temperature of the water should be . The fish are peaceful and can be kept with other non-aggressive fish.

References 

Fishbase: http://www.fishbase.org/0ary/speciessummary.php?id=10629
IUCN Red list: http://www.iucnredlist.org/apps/redlist/search

Tetras
Tropical fish
Characidae
Fishkeeping
Taxa named by Achille Valenciennes
Fish described in 1850